Warmingham is a civil parish in Cheshire East, England. It contains eight buildings that are recorded in the National Heritage List for England as designated listed buildings.  Of these, two are listed at Grade II*, the middle of the three grades, and the others are at Grade II.  Apart from the village of Warmingham, the parish is rural.  The listed buildings consist of houses, a church, a medieval cross base, a bridge, and a telephone kiosk.

Key

Buildings

See also

Listed buildings in Stanthorne
Listed buildings in Wimboldsley
Listed buildings in Moston
Listed buildings in Crewe
Listed buildings in Minshull Vernon

References
Citations

Sources

 

Listed buildings in the Borough of Cheshire East
Lists of listed buildings in Cheshire